Thomas William McCawley (24 July 188116 April 1925) was a chief justice of Queensland.

Biography
McCawley was born in Toowoomba, Queensland, Australia. He was of Irish-Catholic background, his father having been born in County Leitrim, Ireland. On his mother's side he had German ancestry, his mother coming from Darmstadt, Germany. He was educated at the Sisters of Mercy's Hibernian Hall and a state school in Toowoomba. At the age of 14 he took a job for three years as a clerk in the Toowoomba firm of solicitors, Hamilton & Wonderley. Later, McCawley was employed by the Queensland Government Savings Bank, and was successively transferred to the offices of the public service board and the Department of Justice. Studying after hours, he passed the prescribed examinations and was admitted to the Queensland bar on 7 May 1907. In November 1910, at the age of 29 he was appointed crown solicitor, an appointment which was controversial at the time.

McCawley was a staunch Catholic. This, and his links with the Labor Party in Queensland, attracted criticism from some parts of the legal profession in Queensland when he was appointed to a number of senior legal positions in the state There were objections from some quarters, both on political grounds and on the grounds of his lack of experience as practising barrister, when he was appointed as the first president of the Queensland Court of Industrial Arbitration in January 1917, and then puisne judge of the Supreme Court of Queensland in October 1917. Challenges to his appointment in the Supreme Court of Queensland, and in the High Court of Australia, were successful but were overturned by the Privy Council in London. During the next few years, until his premature death, he made a significant contribution to industrial relations law.

McCawley made contributions to industrial law and relations, and framed an award for railway employees. McCawley was made chief justice of Queensland on the retirement of Sir Pope Cooper on 1 April 1922 when, aged 41, he became the youngest chief justice in the British Empire. McCawley held office until 16 April 1925 when he died suddenly of a heart attack at Roma Street railway station in Brisbane while running to catch a train to Ipswich to attend to legal affairs. He was survived by his wife, four sons and one daughter.

McCawley was given a State funeral at St Stephen's Cathedral and buried at Toowong Cemetery.

Legacy

On 13 December 1927 a bronze bust of McCawley was unveiled at the Board of Arbitration in Brisbane.

McCawley Street in the Brisbane suburb of Stafford is named after him.  In September 1961, McCawley Street in the suburb of Watson in Canberra was named after him in recognition, among other things, of his contributions in the field of industrial law and industrial arbitration.

On 22 November 2018, Professor Nicholas Aroney from the University of Queensland delivered the fifth lecture in the 2018 Selden Society lecture series on Law and politics in McCawley's case in the Banco Court in the Supreme Court of Queensland.

See also
List of Judges of the Supreme Court of Queensland
Judiciary of Australia
Background to the McCawley family name

References

 
 M. Cope (1976). "The Political Appointment of T.W. McCawley as President of the Court of Industrial Arbitration, Justice of the Supreme Court and Chief Justice of Queensland", The University of Queensland Law Journal, Vol. 9, No. 2 (1976), pp 224–242.
 Malcolm Cope (1986). 'McCawley, Thomas William (1881 - 1925)', Australian Dictionary of Biography, Volume 10.
 Nicholas Aroney (2006). 'Politics, Law and the Constitution in McCawley's Case', 30(3), Melbourne University Law Review, 605.
 Nicolas Aroney (2018). Fifth lecture in the 2018 Selden Society lecture series on Law and politics in McCawley's case, 22 November 2018.

Notes

External links
McCawley Thomas William — Brisbane City Council Grave Location Search

Chief Justices of Queensland
Judges of the Supreme Court of Queensland
20th-century Australian judges
1881 births
1925 deaths
Burials at Toowong Cemetery
People from Toowoomba